Emery, or corundite, is a dark granular rock used to make an abrasive powder. It largely consists of corundum (aluminium oxide), mixed with other minerals such as the iron-bearing spinels, hercynite, and magnetite, and also rutile (titania). Industrial emery may contain a variety of other minerals and synthetic compounds such as magnesia, mullite, and silica.

It is black or dark grey in colour, less dense than translucent-brown corundum with a specific gravity of between 3.5 and 3.8.  Because it can be a mixture of minerals, no definite Mohs hardness can be assigned: the hardness of corundum is 9 and that of some spinel-group minerals is near 8, but the hardness of others such as magnetite is near 6.

Crushed or naturally eroded emery (known as black sand) is used as an abrasive—for example, on emery boards and emery cloth. It is also used as a traction enhancer in asphalt and tarmac mixtures.

Turkey and Greece are the main suppliers of the world's emery. These two countries produced about 17,500 tons of the mineral in 1987.

The Greek island of Naxos used to be the main source of this industrially important rock type. It has been mined on the eastern side of Naxos for well over two thousand years as mentioned by Pliny the Elder's The Natural History, BOOK XXXVII, CHAP. 32. However, demand for emery has decreased with the development of sintered carbide and oxide materials as abrasives.

A small quantity of emery is used in coated abrasive products, but its main use in the United States is wear-resistant floors and pavements. Many tons are shipped to Asia to be used in grinding rice.

In the United States, the Occupational Safety and Health Administration has set permissible exposure limits for emery in the workplace: TWA 15 mg/m3 total exposure and TWA 5 mg/m3 respiratory exposure.

See also
Emery paper

References

Further reading

External links

 CDC - NIOSH Pocket Guide to Chemical Hazards
 Emery mining in Waldthurn

Aluminium minerals
Abrasives
Corundum varieties
Oxide minerals
Iron minerals